"Dans un autre monde" (meaning "In Another World") is a promotional single from Celine Dion's album, Au cœur du stade (1999). It was released in France and Belgium on 30 August 1999. Originally the song was featured on the album S'il suffisait d'aimer in 1998.

Background and release
The video of Dion performing "Dans un autre monde" live was filmed at the Stade de France in Paris, during two sold-out performances on 19 and 20 June 1999. It was released at the end of August 1999 to promote the Au cœur du stade CD and Au cœur du stade DVD. The latter also included the recording of this song as a bonus.

The song peaked at number 7 on the Belgian Wallonia Airplay Chart. In Quebec, it was played on the radio at the beginning of 1999 and entered the chart there for one week at number 49 on 30 January 1999.

Dion performed it live during the French concerts of her 2008-09 Taking Chances Tour (included in the Tournée Mondiale Taking Chances: Le Spectacle CD/DVD), and during her historic performance in front of 250,000 spectators to celebrate Quebec's 400th anniversary, which was included on Céline sur les Plaines DVD.  The song was also performed in 2013 during the Sans attendre Tour; the Quebec performance was included in the Céline... une seule fois / Live 2013 CD/DVD. Dion also performed "Dans Un Autre Monde" during her Summer Tour 2016, her French concerts in 2017, and Francophone concerts in the Courage World Tour.

"Dans un autre monde" was featured later on certain editions of Dion's 2005 greatest hits album On ne change pas.

Charts

References

Celine Dion songs
1999 singles
French-language songs
Live singles
1998 songs
Songs written by Jean-Jacques Goldman
Columbia Records singles